Live and In Color is a direct-to-video film recorded by The Reverend Horton Heat at Deep Ellum live in Dallas, Texas, in November 2003.

Track listing
  "Reverend Horton Heat's Big Blue Car"
  "Galaxy 500"
  "Like a Rocket"
  "The Party in Your Head"
  "Big Sky"
  "Baddest of the Bad"
  "5-0 Ford"
  "I Can't Surf"
  "Wiggle Stick"
  "400 Bucks"
  "Loco Gringos Like a Party"
  "In Your Wildest Dreams"
  "Marijuana"
  "It's Martini Time"
  "The Jimbo Song"
  "The Devil's Chasing Me"
  "Psychobilly Freakout"
  "Big Red Rocket of Love"

Special features
 "Interview: The Lives and Times of The Reverend Horton Heat"
 "The Origin of the Band: The Roots of The Rev. with Carty Talkington"

Personnel
The Band
 Jim "Reverend Horton Heat" Heath - Guitar, Vocals
 Jimbo Wallace - Upright bass
 Scott Churilla – Drums

External links
 

2003 films
2000s English-language films